Maria Sharapova was the defending champion, but withdrew with a left forearm injury before the tournament began.

Garbiñe Muguruza won her first Premier Mandatory level tournament and second WTA title, defeating Timea Bacsinszky in the final, 7–5, 6–4. Muguruza became the first Spanish player to win a WTA Premier Mandatory tournament.

Seeds

The four Wuhan semifinalists received a bye into the second round. They were as follows:
  Angelique Kerber
  Garbiñe Muguruza
  Roberta Vinci
  Venus Williams

Draw

Finals

Top half

Section 1

Section 2

Bottom half

Section 3

Section 4

Qualifying

Seeds

Qualifiers

Draw

First qualifier

Second qualifier

Third qualifier

Fourth qualifier

Fifth qualifier

Sixth qualifier

Seventh qualifier

Eighth qualifier

External links
 Main Draw
 Qualifying Draw

Open Women's Singles